Chelmon is a genus of marine ray-finned fish in the family Chaetodontidae, the butterflyfishes. They are tropical species native to the western Pacific Ocean.

Species
There are currently three recognized species in this genus:
 Chelmon marginalis J. Richardson, 1842 – margined coralfish
 Chelmon muelleri Klunzinger, 1880 – blackfin coralfish
 Chelmon rostratus (Linnaeus, 1758) – copperband butterflyfish

References

 
Marine fish genera
 
Taxa named by Hippolyte Cloquet